My Paparotti is a 2013 South Korean film starring Lee Je-hoon and Han Suk-kyu. It focuses on the special relationship between a high school gangster and the music teacher who helps him pursue his dream of becoming a singer like the late tenor Luciano Pavarotti.

Allegedly based on the real-life story of Kim Ho-joong, who first appeared on the variety show Star King in July 2009, where he talked about growing up as a thug and joining gangs, until his grandmother encouraged him to pursue singing; and in 2020 became one of the seven finalists of the trot audition program Mr. Trot.

Plot
Sang-jin, a formerly promising vocalist, now works as a high school music teacher after suffering from a vocal cord tumor. His ordinary life becomes full of drama when Jang-ho, a local teenage gangster, is transferred to Sang-jin's school. Jang-ho is a thorn in Sang-jin's side, but upon hearing Jang-ho sing, he is deeply impressed with his natural talent and decides to commit to his training. As the 2 develop their special bond, an unexpected conflict arises between the two gangs in town which forces Jang-ho into a critical situation. Will Jang-ho overcome the obstacles and fulfill his destiny as a world-class vocalist?

Cast
Lee Je-hoon - Jang-ho
Han Suk-kyu - Sang-jin
Kang So-ra - Sook-hee
Oh Dal-su - Principal Deok-saeng
Cho Jin-woong - Chang-soo
Lee Sang-hoon - dean of students 	
Lee Do-yeon - English teacher
Lee Jae-yong - gang boss
Jin Kyung - Mi-sun, Sang-jin's wife
Yang Han-yeol as Sang-jin's son
Bae Sung-woo - Sang-jin's alumnus
Kim Yong-hoon - Jang-ho's subordinate
Kim Ji-seok - drunken man (cameo)

Awards and nominations

References

External links
  
 
 
 

2010s musical drama films
South Korean musical drama films
2013 films
Showbox films
Films directed by Yoon Jong-chan
2010s South Korean films
2010s Korean-language films